The 2001 Grand Prix de Tennis de Lyon was a men's tennis tournament played on indoor carpet courts at the Palais des Sports de Gerland in Lyon, France, and was part of the International Series of the 2001 ATP Tour. It was the 15th edition of the tournament and took place from 8 October until 14 October 2001. Unseeded Ivan Ljubičić on the singles title.

Finals

Singles

 Ivan Ljubičić defeated  Younes El Aynaoui 6–3, 6–2
 It was Ljubičić's only title of the year and the 1st of his career.

Doubles

 Daniel Nestor /  Nenad Zimonjić defeated  Arnaud Clément /  Sébastien Grosjean 6–1, 6–2
 It was Nestor's 4th title of the year and the 20th of his career. It was Zimonjić's only title of the year and the 4th of his career.

References

External links
 ITF tournament edition details

 
Grand Prix de Tennis de Lyon